Chromatin is a complex of DNA and protein found in eukaryotic cells. The primary function is to package long DNA molecules into more compact, denser structures. This prevents the strands from becoming tangled and also plays important roles in reinforcing the DNA during cell division, preventing DNA damage, and regulating gene expression and DNA replication. During mitosis and meiosis, chromatin facilitates proper segregation of the chromosomes in anaphase; the characteristic shapes of chromosomes visible during this stage are the result of DNA being coiled into highly condensed chromatin.

The primary protein components of chromatin are histones. An octamer of two sets of four histone cores (Histone H2A, Histone H2B, Histone H3, and Histone H4) bind to DNA and function as "anchors" around which the strands are wound. In general, there are three levels of chromatin organization:

 DNA wraps around histone proteins, forming nucleosomes and the so-called beads on a string structure (euchromatin).
 Multiple histones wrap into a 30-nanometer fiber consisting of nucleosome arrays in their most compact form (heterochromatin).
 Higher-level DNA supercoiling of the 30 nm fiber produces the metaphase chromosome (during mitosis and meiosis).

Many organisms, however, do not follow this organization scheme. For example, spermatozoa and avian red blood cells have more tightly packed chromatin than most eukaryotic cells, and trypanosomatid protozoa do not condense their chromatin into visible chromosomes at all. Prokaryotic cells have entirely different structures for organizing their DNA (the prokaryotic chromosome equivalent is called a genophore and is localized within the nucleoid region).

The overall structure of the chromatin network further depends on the stage of the cell cycle. During interphase, the chromatin is structurally loose to allow access to RNA and DNA polymerases that transcribe and replicate the DNA. The local structure of chromatin during interphase depends on the specific genes present in the DNA. Regions of DNA containing genes which are actively transcribed ("turned on") are less tightly compacted and closely associated with RNA polymerases in a structure known as euchromatin, while regions containing inactive genes ("turned off") are generally more condensed and associated with structural proteins in heterochromatin. Epigenetic modification of the structural proteins in chromatin via methylation and acetylation also alters local chromatin structure and therefore gene expression. There is limited understanding of chromatin structure and it is active area of research in molecular biology.

Dynamic chromatin structure and hierarchy

Chromatin undergoes various structural changes during a cell cycle. Histone proteins are the basic packers and arrangers of chromatin and can be modified by various post-translational modifications to alter chromatin packing (histone modification). Most modifications occur on histone tails. The positively charged histone cores only partially counteract the negative charge of the DNA phosphate backbone resulting in a negative net charge of the overall structure. An imbalance of charge within the polymer causes electrostatic repulsion between neighboring chromatin regions that promote interactions with positively charged proteins, molecules, and cations. As these modifications occur, the electrostatic environment surrounding the chromatin will flux and the level of chromatin compaction will alter. The consequences in terms of chromatin accessibility and compaction depend both on the modified amino acid and the type of modification. For example, histone acetylation results in loosening and increased accessibility of chromatin for replication and transcription. Lysine trimethylation can either lead to increased transcriptional activity (trimethylation of histone H3 lysine 4) or transcriptional repression and chromatin compaction (trimethylation of histone H3 lysine 9 or 27). Several studies suggested that different modifications could occur simultaneously. For example, it was proposed that a bivalent structure (with trimethylation of both lysine 4 and 27 on histone H3) is involved in early mammalian development. Another study tested the role of H4K16ac on chromatin structure and found that homogeneous acetylation inhibited 30 nm chromatin formation and blocked adenosine triphosphate remodeling. This singular modification changed the dynamics of the chromatin which shows that acetylation of H4 at K16 is vital for proper intra- and inter- functionality of chromatin structure.

Polycomb-group proteins play a role in regulating genes through modulation of chromatin structure.

For additional information, see Chromatin variant, Histone modifications in chromatin regulation and RNA polymerase control by chromatin structure.

DNA structure

In nature, DNA can form three structures, A-, B-, and Z-DNA. A- and B-DNA are very similar, forming right-handed helices, whereas Z-DNA is a left-handed helix with a zig-zag phosphate backbone. Z-DNA is thought to play a specific role in chromatin structure and transcription because of the properties of the junction between B- and Z-DNA.

At the junction of B- and Z-DNA, one pair of bases is flipped out from normal bonding. These play a dual role of a site of recognition by many proteins and as a sink for torsional stress from RNA polymerase or nucleosome binding.DNA bases are stored as a code structure with four chemical bases such as “Adenine (A), Guanine (G), Cytosine (C), and Thymine (T)”. The order and sequences of these chemical structures of DNA are reflected as information available for the creation and control of human organisms. “A with T and C with G” pairing up to build the DNA base pair. Sugar and phosphate molecules are also paired with these bases, making DNA nucleotides arrange 2 long spiral strands unitedly called “double helix”. In eukaryotes, DNA consists of a cell nucleus and the DNA is providing strength and direction to the mechanism of heredity. Moreover, between the nitrogenous bonds of the 2 DNA, homogenous bonds are forming.

Nucleosomes and beads-on-a-string

The basic repeat element of chromatin is the nucleosome, interconnected by sections of linker DNA, a far shorter arrangement than pure DNA in solution.

In addition to core histones, a linker histone H1 exists that contacts the exit/entry of the DNA strand on the nucleosome. The nucleosome core particle, together with histone H1, is known as a chromatosome.  Nucleosomes, with about 20 to 60 base pairs of linker DNA, can form, under non-physiological conditions, an approximately 10 nm beads on a string fibre.

The nucleosomes bind DNA non-specifically, as required by their function in general DNA packaging.  There are, however, large DNA sequence preferences that govern nucleosome positioning.  This is due primarily to the varying physical properties of different DNA sequences: For instance, adenine (A),  and thymine (T) is more favorably compressed into the inner minor grooves. This means nucleosomes can bind preferentially at one position approximately every 10 base pairs (the helical repeat of DNA)- where the DNA is rotated to maximise the number of A and T bases that will lie in the inner minor groove. (See nucleic acid structure.)

30-nanometer chromatin fiber

With addition of H1, the beads-on-a-string structure in turn coils into a 30 nm diameter helical structure known as the 30 nm fibre or filament. The precise structure of the chromatin fiber in the cell is not known in detail.

This level of chromatin structure is thought to be the form of heterochromatin, which contains mostly transcriptionally silent genes. Electron microscopy studies have demonstrated that the 30 nm fiber is highly dynamic such that it unfolds into a 10 nm fiber beads-on-a-string structure when transversed by an RNA polymerase engaged in transcription.

The existing models commonly accept that the nucleosomes lie perpendicular to the axis of the fibre, with linker histones arranged internally.
A stable 30 nm fibre relies on the regular positioning of nucleosomes along DNA. Linker DNA is relatively resistant to bending and rotation. This makes the length of linker DNA critical to the stability of the fibre, requiring nucleosomes to be separated by lengths that permit rotation and folding into the required orientation without excessive stress to the DNA.
In this view, different lengths of the linker DNA should produce different folding topologies of the chromatin fiber. Recent theoretical work, based on electron-microscopy images
of reconstituted fibers supports this view.

Spatial organization of chromatin in the cell nucleus

The spatial arrangement of the chromatin within the nucleus is not random - specific regions of the chromatin can be found in certain territories. Territories are, for example, the lamina-associated domains (LADs), and the topologically associating domains (TADs), which are bound together by protein complexes. Currently, polymer models such as the Strings & Binders Switch (SBS) model and the Dynamic Loop (DL) model are used to describe the folding of chromatin within the nucleus. The arrangement of chromatin within the nucleus may also play a role in nuclear stress and restoring nuclear membrane deformation by mechanical stress. When chromatin is condensed, the nucleus becomes more rigid. When chromatin is decondensed, the nucleus becomes more elastic with less force exerted on the inner nuclear membrane. This observation sheds light on other possible cellular functions of chromatin organization outside of genomic regulation.

Cell-cycle dependent structural organization

 Interphase: The structure of chromatin during interphase of mitosis is optimized to allow simple access of transcription and DNA repair factors to the DNA while compacting the DNA into the nucleus. The structure varies depending on the access required to the DNA. Genes that require regular access by RNA polymerase require the looser structure provided by euchromatin.
 Metaphase: The metaphase structure of chromatin differs vastly to that of interphase. It is optimised for physical strength and manageability, forming the classic chromosome structure seen in karyotypes. The structure of the condensed chromatin is thought to be loops of 30 nm fibre to a central scaffold of proteins. It is, however, not well-characterised. Chromosome scaffolds play an important role to hold the chromatin into compact chromosomes. Loops of 30 nm structure further condense with scaffold, into higher order structures. Chromosome scaffolds are made of proteins including condensin, type IIA topoisomerase  and kinesin family member 4 (KIF4). The physical strength of chromatin is vital for this stage of division to prevent shear damage to the DNA as the daughter chromosomes are separated. To maximise strength the composition of the chromatin changes as it approaches the centromere, primarily through alternative histone H1 analogues. During mitosis, although most of the chromatin is tightly compacted, there are small regions that are not as tightly compacted. These regions often correspond to promoter regions of genes that were active in that cell type prior to chromatin formation. The lack of compaction of these regions is called bookmarking, which is an epigenetic mechanism believed to be important for transmitting to daughter cells the "memory" of which genes were active prior to entry into mitosis. This bookmarking mechanism is needed to help transmit this memory because transcription ceases during mitosis.

Chromatin and bursts of transcription

Chromatin and its interaction with enzymes has been researched, and a conclusion being made is that it is relevant and an important factor in gene expression. Vincent G. Allfrey, a professor at Rockefeller University, stated that RNA synthesis is related to histone acetylation. The lysine amino acid attached to the end of the histones is positively charged. The acetylation of these tails would make the chromatin ends neutral, allowing for DNA access.

When the chromatin decondenses, the DNA is open to entry of molecular machinery. Fluctuations between open and closed chromatin may contribute to the discontinuity of transcription, or transcriptional bursting.  Other factors are probably involved, such as the association and dissociation of transcription factor complexes with chromatin. Specifically, RNA polymerase and transcriptional proteins have been shown to congregate into droplets via phase separation, and recent studies have suggested that 10 nm chromatin demonstrates liquid-like behavior increasing the targetability of genomic DNA. The interactions between linker histones and disordered tail regions act as an electrostatic glue organizing large-scale chromatin into a dynamic, liquid-like domain. Decreased chromatin compaction comes with increased chromatin mobility and easier transcriptional access to DNA. The phenomenon, as opposed to simple probabilistic models of transcription, can account for the high variability in gene expression occurring between cells in isogenic populations.

Alternative chromatin organizations

During metazoan spermiogenesis, the spermatid's chromatin is remodeled into a more spaced-packaged, widened, almost crystal-like structure. This process is associated with the cessation of transcription and involves nuclear protein exchange. The histones are mostly displaced, and replaced by protamines (small, arginine-rich proteins). It is proposed that in yeast, regions devoid of histones become very fragile after transcription; HMO1, an HMG-box protein, helps in stabilizing nucleosomes-free chromatin.

Chromatin and DNA repair

A variety of internal and external agents can cause DNA damage in cells. Many factors influence how the repair route is selected, including the cell cycle phase and chromatin segment where the break occurred. In terms of initiating 5’ end DNA repair, the p53 binding protein 1(53BP1) and BRCA 1 are important protein components that influence Double-strand break repair pathway selection. The 53BP1 complex attaches to chromatin near DNA break and activities downstream factors such as Rap1-Interacting Factor 1 (RIF1) and the Shieldin, which protects DNA ends against nucleolytic destruction. DNA damage process occurs within the condition of chromatin, and the constantly changing chromatin environment has a large effect on it. Accessing and repairing the damaged cell of DNA, the genome condenses into chromatin and repairing it through modifying the histone residues. Through altering the chromatin structure, histones residues are adding chemical groups namely phosphate, acetyl and one or more than one methyl group and these are controlling the expressions of gene building by proteins to acquire DNA. Moreover, resynthesis of the delighted zone, DNA will be repaired by processing and restructuring the damaged bases. In order to maintain genomic integrity, “homologous recombination and classical non-homologous end joining process” has been followed by DNA to be repaired.

The packaging of eukaryotic DNA into chromatin presents a barrier to all DNA-based processes that require recruitment of enzymes to their sites of action. To allow the critical cellular process of DNA repair, the chromatin must be remodeled.  In eukaryotes, ATP-dependent chromatin remodeling complexes and histone-modifying enzymes are two predominant factors employed to accomplish this remodeling process.

Chromatin relaxation occurs rapidly at the site of a DNA damage.  This process is initiated by PARP1 protein that starts to appear at DNA damage in less than a second, with half maximum accumulation within 1.6 seconds after the damage occurs.  Next the chromatin remodeler Alc1 quickly attaches to the product of PARP1, and completes arrival at the DNA damage within 10 seconds of the damage.  About half of the maximum chromatin relaxation, presumably due to action of Alc1, occurs by 10 seconds. This then allows recruitment of the DNA repair enzyme MRE11, to initiate DNA repair, within 13 seconds.

γH2AX, the phosphorylated form of H2AX is also involved in the early steps leading to chromatin decondensation after DNA damage occurrence.  The histone variant H2AX constitutes about 10% of the H2A histones in human chromatin.  γH2AX (H2AX phosphorylated on serine 139) can be detected as soon as 20 seconds after irradiation of cells (with DNA double-strand break formation), and half maximum accumulation of γH2AX occurs in one minute.  The extent of chromatin with phosphorylated γH2AX is about two million base pairs at the site of a DNA double-strand break.  γH2AX does not, itself, cause chromatin decondensation, but within 30 seconds of irradiation, RNF8 protein can be detected in association with γH2AX.  RNF8 mediates extensive chromatin decondensation, through its subsequent interaction with CHD4, a component of the nucleosome remodeling and deacetylase complex NuRD.

After undergoing relaxation subsequent to DNA damage, followed by DNA repair, chromatin recovers to a compaction state close to its pre-damage level after about 20 min.

Methods to investigate chromatin

 ChIP-seq (Chromatin immЬсщыunoprecipitation sequencing) is recognized as the vastly utilized chromatin identification method it has been using the antibodies that actively selected, identify and combine with proteins including "histones, histone restructuring, transaction factors and cofactors". This has been providing data about the state of chromatin and the transaction of a gene by trimming "oligonucleotides" that are unbound. Chromatin immunoprecipitation sequencing aimed against different histone modifications, can be used to identify chromatin states throughout the genome. Different modifications have been linked to various states of chromatin. 
 DNase-seq (DNase I hypersensitive sites Sequencing) uses the sensitivity of accessible regions in the genome to the DNase I enzyme to map open or accessible regions in the genome. 
 FAIRE-seq (Formaldehyde-Assisted Isolation of Regulatory Elements sequencing) uses the chemical properties of protein-bound DNA in a two-phase separation method to extract  nucleosome depleted regions from the genome.
 ATAC-seq (Assay for Transposable Accessible Chromatin sequencing) uses the Tn5 transposase to integrate (synthetic) transposons into accessible regions of the genome consequentially highlighting the localisation of nucleosomes and transcription factors across the genome.
 DNA footprinting is a method aimed at identifying protein-bound DNA. It uses labeling and fragmentation coupled to gel electrophoresis to identify areas of the genome that have been bound by proteins.  
 MNase-seq (Micrococcal Nuclease sequencing) uses the micrococcal nuclease enzyme to identify nucleosome positioning throughout the genome.
 Chromosome conformation capture determines the spatial organization of chromatin in the nucleus, by inferring genomic locations that physically interact.
 MACC profiling (Micrococcal nuclease ACCessibility profiling) uses titration series of chromatin digests with micrococcal nuclease to identify chromatin accessibility as well as to map nucleosomes and non-histone DNA-binding proteins in both open and closed regions of the genome.

Chromatin and knots

It has been a puzzle how decondensed interphase chromosomes remain essentially unknotted. The natural expectation is that in the presence of type II DNA topoisomerases that permit passages of double-stranded DNA regions through each other, all chromosomes should reach the state of topological equilibrium. The topological equilibrium in highly crowded interphase chromosomes forming chromosome territories would result in formation of highly knotted chromatin fibres. However, Chromosome Conformation Capture (3C) methods revealed that the decay of contacts with the genomic distance in interphase chromosomes is practically the same as in the crumpled globule state that is formed when long polymers condense without formation of any knots. To remove knots from highly crowded chromatin, one would need an active process that should not only provide the energy to move the system from the state of topological equilibrium but also guide topoisomerase-mediated passages in such a way that knots would be efficiently unknotted instead of making the knots even more complex. It has been shown that the process of chromatin-loop extrusion is ideally suited to actively unknot chromatin fibres in interphase chromosomes.

Chromatin: alternative definitions

The term, introduced by Walther Flemming, has multiple meanings:
 Simple and concise definition: Chromatin is a macromolecular complex of a DNA macromolecule and protein macromolecules (and RNA). The proteins package and arrange the DNA and control its functions within the cell nucleus.
 A biochemists' operational definition: Chromatin is the DNA/protein/RNA complex extracted from eukaryotic lysed interphase nuclei. Just which of the multitudinous substances present in a nucleus will constitute a part of the extracted material partly depends on the technique each researcher uses. Furthermore, the composition and properties of chromatin vary from one cell type to another, during the development of a specific cell type, and at different stages in the cell cycle.
 The DNA + histone = chromatin definition: The DNA double helix in the cell nucleus is packaged by special proteins termed histones. The formed protein/DNA complex is called chromatin. The basic structural unit of chromatin is the nucleosome.

The first definition allows for "chromatins" to be defined in other domains of life like bacteria and archaea, using any DNA-binding proteins that condenses the molecule. These proteins are usually referred to nucleoid-associated proteins (NAPs); examples include AsnC/LrpC with HU. In addition, some archaea do produce nucleosomes from proteins homologous to eukaryotic histones.

Chromatin Remodeling:

Chromatin remodeling can result from covalent modification of histones that physically remodel, move or remove nucleosomes. Studies of Sanosaka et al 2022, says that Chromatin remodeler CHD7 regulate cell type-specific gene expression in human neural crest cells.

Nobel Prizes

The following scientists were recognized for their contributions to chromatin research with Nobel Prizes:

See also

 Active chromatin sequence
 Chromatid
 DAnCER database (2010)
 Epigenetics
 Histone-modifying enzymes
 Position-effect variegation
 Transcriptional bursting

Notes

References

Additional sources

 Cooper, Geoffrey M. 2000. The Cell, 2nd edition, A Molecular Approach. Chapter 4.2 Chromosomes and Chromatin.
 
 Cremer, T. 1985. Von der Zellenlehre zur Chromosomentheorie: Naturwissenschaftliche Erkenntnis und Theorienwechsel in der frühen Zell- und Vererbungsforschung, Veröffentlichungen aus der Forschungsstelle für Theoretische Pathologie der Heidelberger Akademie der Wissenschaften. Springer-Vlg., Berlin, Heidelberg.
 Elgin, S. C. R. (ed.). 1995. Chromatin Structure and Gene Expression, vol. 9. IRL Press, Oxford, New York, Tokyo.
 
 
 
 
 
 Pollard, T., and W. Earnshaw. 2002. Cell Biology. Saunders.
 Saumweber, H. 1987. Arrangement of Chromosomes in Interphase Cell Nuclei, p. 223-234. In W. Hennig (ed.), Structure and Function of Eucaryotic Chromosomes, vol. 14. Springer-Verlag, Berlin, Heidelberg.
 
 Van Holde KE. 1989. Chromatin. New York: Springer-Verlag. .
 Van Holde, K., J. Zlatanova, G. Arents, and E. Moudrianakis. 1995. Elements of chromatin structure: histones, nucleosomes, and fibres, p. 1-26. In S. C. R. Elgin (ed.), Chromatin structure and gene expression. IRL Press at Oxford University Press, Oxford.

External links
 Chromatin, Histones & Cathepsin; PMAP The Proteolysis Map-animation
 Nature journal: recent chromatin publications and news
 Protocol for in vitro Chromatin Assembly
 ENCODE threads Explorer Chromatin patterns at transcription factor binding sites. Nature (journal)

Molecular genetics
Nuclear substructures